The Santa Rosa de Lima Cartel or CSRL is a Mexican criminal organization from the state of Guanajuato. Founded in 2014, it was initially headed by "The Sledgehammer". They mainly earn their income from oil theft. In June 2020, it was reported that state government raids and turf wars with the Jalisco New Generation Cartel resulted in the Santa Rosa de Lima losing much of their territories in Guanajuato, Querétaro and Hidalgo and all of their "soldiers." However, cartel members still maintain a small presence in certain municipalities of Guanajuato, such as Villagrán, though they are not active in organized crime. Ortiz was captured by state and federal authorities on 2 August 2020 along with 5 other people.

History
The name of the Cartel refers to the town of Santa Rosa de Lima located in the municipality of Villagrán in Guanajuato. There, the organization was born, which has expanded throughout the entity and even in adjacent parts of the state with Querétaro and Michoacán, where its main activity is the theft of fuel, registering 1,696 milking points during 2017. Others activities carried out are extortion of small and medium-sized entrepreneurs in cities such as Celaya, Irapuato and Salamanca.

On 3 March 2019, authorities from the state of Guanajuato, supported by federal forces, launched the “Timon Strike” operation against the organization, bringing up to 42 detainees up to now, in addition to recovering more than 100 vehicles and searching 25 properties. This operation resulted in a wave of violence generated by the dispute of the territory with the Jalisco New Generation Cartel.

In mid-October, 2020, authorities captured Adán Ochoa (aka: El Azul), the leader of the Cartel.

Organization and criminal activities

Between 2017 and 2020, the cartel was commanded by José Antonio Yépez Ortiz, who had a nearby circle made up of 14 people including their families. Its financial operators are presumed to be the uncles of "El Marro", with Santiago "G" aka "Bachicha" the main operator. The authorities also identify Juan Manuel "A", Artemio "E" aka "El Temo", Eusebio "G" aka "El Titis", José Alejandro "J" among others.

The Santa Rosa de Lima cartel stormed the state with greater force during the year of 2017, which can be noticed by a video published through social networks, where the Marro, surrounded by more than a hundred armed people, with tactical team, only allowed to the armed forces, challenged the CJNG and the other criminal organizations that operate in Guanajuato. After this announcement, a great deal of insecurity has been reported in the area, which even President Andrés Manuel López Obrador confirmed that since his government started (on 1 December 2018) the state of Guanajuato has been reported as one of the most violent entities, confirmed by Criminal Traffic Light. The report states that more than 28,816 homicides were committed during 2018, which meant an increase of 15% compared to 2017 being the worst rate of the last 20 years, since the federal actions against criminal organizations began of the country in 2000. 

On 9 March 2019, there was a mass shooting at La Playa Men's Club, a nightclub in Salamanca, Guanajuato, Mexico. 15 people were killed and between 7-9 were injured. The authorities only reported fourteen deaths hiding the real figure. The attack was due to reports about the sea in the interior of the place and for not paying a floor charge. Witnesses described the attackers as a group of armed men who arrived in three CJNG vans. Previously the owner of the place had received patent threats from the CJNG for the collection of floor.

On 29 October, Marco Antonio Flores Martínez, aka El Ñecas, was arrested, who planned to place a bomb on a plane, as well as detonate a Pemex pipeline in response to the operations that the government of Andrés Manuel López Obrador launched. at the beginning of his government in December 2018 against the cartel.

The Santa Rosa de Lima Cartel was accused of a bomb attempt at the Pemex refinery in Salamanca, Guanajuato on 25 June 2020, after several of the cartel's leaders were arrested five days earlier.

Demise
On 11 June 2020, Óscar Balderas, a Mexican journalist and expert in organized crime, revealed to Insight Crime journalist Victoria Dittmar that government crackdowns and a turf war with the rival Jalisco New Generation Cartel (CJNG) resulted in the Santa Rosa de Lima Cartel losing a significant amount of land in Querétaro, Hidalgo and even their native state of Guanajuanto. According to Balderas, “The most recent outbreaks of violence have been the execution of the last soldiers [of the CSRL].” However, some Santa Rosa de Lima Cartel members still remain in certain municipalities of Guanajuato, such as Villagrán. However, the area was not known for still being active in organized crime. 

On 22 June, it was reported that Santa Rosa de Lima Cartel leader José Antonio “El Marro” Yépez's mother María Ortiz, sister Juana “N,” and cousin Rosalba “N,” were among the 26 Santa de Lima Cartel members arrested in Celaya, Guanajuato on June 20, 2020. María Ortiz, who was a financier for the cartel, had more than 2 million pesos (US $89,500) on her when she was detained as well as approximately one kilogram of a substance believed to be methamphetamine. Those arrested had arrived to receive their weekly payroll. The newspaper Milenio confirmed that in addition to these 26 arrests, at least four other people with links to the Santa Rosa de Lima Cartel were arrested after raids on properties near the border between Celaya and Villagrán, the municipality where the criminal organization has been based. However, El Marro managed to escape the Celaya raid and afterwards posted at least two social media videos, one where he thanked people who sent tire fires so he could escape arrest and another where he decided to consider entering into an alliance with the Sinaloa Cartel following the arrest of his mother. On June 23, 2020, it was revealed that the CJNG had sent assassins to kill El Marro on many occasions, including at his sister's wedding earlier in the year. It was also revealed that with Santa de Lima Rosa Cartel's demise, the CJNG was struggling to gain influence in territory controlled by the Santa Rosa de Lima Cartel as well.

On 2 August, El Marro, also known as "The Sledgehammer”, was captured in a joint operation between Guanajuato's state government and Mexico's Secretariat of Public Security. At least five other people were detained in the joint operation as well, and a businesswoman from Apaseo El Alto who had been kidnapped was rescued.

References

Organizations established in 2014
2014 establishments in Mexico
Drug cartels in Mexico
Mexican drug war
Guanajuato